Coalición Colombia is a conservative political party in Colombia. 
At the last legislative elections, 10 March 2002, the party won as one of the many small parties parliamentary representation.

Conservative parties in Colombia